The State Street Bridge, also known as the Soldiers and Sailors Memorial Bridge, is a  concrete, deck arch bridge that spans Pennsylvania Route 230 and Paxton Creek in Harrisburg, Pennsylvania. The bridge was completed in 1930 and was intended to be the principal entrance into downtown Harrisburg and the Pennsylvania State Capitol Complex from the east.

The bridge was listed on the National Register of Historic Places on June 22, 1988, and was documented by the Historic American Engineering Record in 1997.

History 
After the Pennsylvania State Capitol building burned to ground in 1897, plans were drawn up to improve and expand the park that surrounds the Capitol building. The plans were for a more impressive Capitol building that would prevent other Pennsylvania cities like Philadelphia from challenging Harrisburg's claim as the seat of the state government. After the land that was necessary for the expansion was acquired in 1916, Arnold Brunner was hired to design the plans for the construction and landscaping of the new buildings. Planning was interrupted by World War I.

After the war, in 1919, it was decided to make the bridge a memorial to the armed forces of the United States and Pennsylvania that had fought in the war. The Pennsylvania General Assembly passed an act authorizing the construction of the bridge on July 18, 1919. In 1926, William Gehron and Sidney Ross revised the plans that Brunner had made for the bridge in 1921 after his death in 1925. Changes they made included a more massive bridge and taller, "more streamlined" pylons.

Construction began on the bridge in September 1925. The General Assembly appropriated $361,000 ($ in present-day terms) for the bridge in the 1927 and 1929 sessions of the assembly. The city of Harrisburg also contributed $300,000 ($ in present-day terms). The bridge was completed on August 22, 1930.

The bridge was renovated in 1955 by J. Richard Nissley, who added a  steel girder span on the bridge's east end. The road deck and sidewalks were replaced in 1957. The State Street Bridge was listed on the National Register of Historic Places on June 22, 1988.

Design 

Each  pylon has an eagle perched on it, one signifying the United States Army and the other signifying the United States Navy. The eagles were created by sculptor Lee Lawrie. The four faces of the pylons each have the year of one of eight wars that United States had participated in up until World War I.

The keystone of each arch of the bridge has a carving of a weapon that was developed and used during World War I.

Although never built, plans for the bridge included a museum built under the western end of the bridge. The museum was to include Pennsylvania flags that were used in battle and a list of all the Pennsylvanians who fought in World War I.

See also 

List of bridges documented by the Historic American Engineering Record in Pennsylvania
List of bridges on the National Register of Historic Places in Pennsylvania
National Register of Historic Places listings in Dauphin County, Pennsylvania

Notes

References 

 by Blythe Semmer, 1997

Concrete bridges in Pennsylvania
Bridges completed in 1930
Bridges in Harrisburg, Pennsylvania
Road bridges on the National Register of Historic Places in Pennsylvania
Historic American Engineering Record in Pennsylvania
National Register of Historic Places in Harrisburg, Pennsylvania
Deck arch bridges in the United States